Sebastiania chiapensis is a species of flowering plant in the family Euphorbiaceae. It was described in 1968. It is native to Chiapas, Mexico.

References

Plants described in 1968
Flora of Mexico
chiapensis